Newtonville is one of the thirteen villages within the city of Newton in Middlesex County, Massachusetts, United States.

Geography
Newtonville is a predominantly residential neighborhood. It is divided into two parts by the Massachusetts Turnpike and the MBTA Commuter Rail running through an open trench below grade, and requiring reconnection via several bridges over the trench. 

At the core of the village is the Newtonville Historic District.  The Washington Park Historic District and many individual residential structures also have notable architectural features and history and appear on the National Register of Historic Places listings in Newton, Massachusetts.

The Star Market on Austin Street (briefly renamed "Shaw's") was one of the first projects in the country to acquire air rights for construction; the supermarket is built over the Massachusetts Turnpike.

Newtonville was once served by the now defunct Newton Nexus bus, a free service provided by the city of Newton. Walnut Street is the main street of the village. The urban section of the road is home to restaurants, bakeries, and cafes, several banks, multiple fitness centers, and dry cleaners. Branching off of Walnut is the Austin Street commercial area, which sports a Starbucks, restaurants, a toy store, and the air rights supermarket entrance.

On the north side of the turnpike, on Washington Street (which runs parallel to the Massachusetts Turnpike) there are many more restaurants, hair salons, barber shops, nail salons, liquor stores, Newton's largest Post Office, and a Whole Foods supermarket.

Located in Newtonville is Newton North High School, one of the city's two high schools, and Cabot Elementary School, one of the largest elementary schools in the city. The southern part of the village is home to Bullough's Pond and the Johnny  Kelley  Statue, marking the beginning of Heartbreak Hill for runners in the Boston Marathon.

A mixed-use development known as Washington Place is nearing completion on the corner of Walnut and Washington Street in Newtonville's center. It brings 140 new residential units, 35 of which are affordable housing,  of office space, and extra parking for nearby businesses and residents. The project is being developed by Mark Development.

Newtonville is bordered by four other villages. Nonantum to the north, Newton Corner to the east, Newton Centre to the south, and West Newton to the west. Although Newton City Hall is located in Newton Centre, its property is contiguous with the border of Newtonville.

Transportation
Newtonville is bisected by the Massachusetts Turnpike, connecting it to neighboring villages in Newton and downtown Boston.

The village is served by the MBTA Commuter Rail's Framingham/Worcester Line at Newtonville station, and by MBTA bus routes 59, 553, 554, and 556. Route 59 runs down Walnut Street through the center of the village and allows for transport to Watertown Square, MBTA Newton Highlands Station on the Green Line D branch, and the Needham Line on the Commuter Rail.

Gallery

Notable people 

Alice Standish Allen (1907–2002), first female engineering geologist in North America
Sheldon Brown (1944–2008), bicycle mechanic, technical expert and author
William Claflin (1818–1905), 27th Governor of Massachusetts
Charles Jay Connick (1875-1945), painter and designer of stained glass
Julian Eltinge (born William Julian Dalton; 1881–1941), actor
Josephine Hull (1877–1957), actress, Academy Award winner
Warren Huston (1913–1999), professional baseball player
Kurt Lewin (1890–1947), philosopher, "founder of social psychology"
Lillie Eginton Warren (1859–1926), educator, author, school founder, inventor of Expression Reading

See also

 Church of the Open Word
 Claflin School
 First Church of Christ, Scientist
 National Register of Historic Places listings in Newton, Massachusetts
 Masonic Building
 Newtonville Historic District
 Washington Park Historic District (Newton, Massachusetts)
 Celia Thaxter House
 Ross, a steam-powered automobile produced in Newtonville from 1906 to 1909

References

Villages in Newton, Massachusetts
Villages in Massachusetts